The Dr. Sivanthi Aditanar College of Engineering (Dr.SACOE) is an engineering college situated in Tiruchendur, Thoothukudi, Tamil Nadu, India. It was established in 1995 and offers both undergraduate and postgraduate engineering degrees with the principal objective of bringing quality education within the reach of the weaker sections, particularly in rural areas. The college has been established with the aim of imparting professional & technical education with emphasis on building analytical and reasoning abilities as well as practical skills. It is affiliated with Anna University, Chennai and approved by the All India Council for Technical Education and the National Board of Accreditation. and an ISO 9001:2008 Certified Institution. The medium of instruction is English for all courses, examinations, seminar presentations and project reports.

Departments 
 Mechanical Engineering
 Computer Science Engineering
 Electronics and Communication Engineering
 Electrical and Electronics Engineering
 Information Technology
 Civil Engineering

Infrastructure 

A mineral water plant located within the campus has a capacity of 10,000 litres per day. Also on the campus are located the photo copying centre, Cafeteria, Parking lot, Stand-by power generators, a separate telephone exchange, water treatment plant, and students' amenities. The college provided facility of more than 20 buses for day scholars. The campus has Wi-Fi connectivity. Mobile phones are not allowed in this college.

Infrastructure of the college has six separate buildings for the departments
 Administrative Block
 Civil Engineering Block 
 Electrical Sciences Block
 Information Technology Block
 Mechanical Block
 Structural Engineering Block

Most of the student population stays on campus in hostels. The single gender hostels, two for men and one for women, are namely

Boys Hostels:
 Boys Hostel I
 Boys Hostel II

Girls Hostel:
 Mangal Mala Women's Hostel

Clubs and Associations 
Clubs and professional organisations at Dr. Sivanthi Aditanar College of Engineering serve as an important nodal point in students' lives. Students enthusiastically perform managerial, organisational and participatory roles in these groups.

 Sivanthi Civil Association for Learning Engineers (SCALE)
 Sivanthi Computer AssociatioN (SCAN)
 Sivanthi Prolific Association of Communication Engineers (SPACE)
 Electrical Association for Sivanthi Engineers (EASE)
 Buoyant Infotechies Of Sivanthi (BIOS)
 Mechanical Association for Sivanthi Scholars (MASS)
 SivantHi Association for Rising Executives (SHARE)
 Sivanthi Science Club 
 ICI Students' Chapter
 Computer Society of India (CSI)
 Institution of Engineers (India) CSE Students' Chapter
 Institute of Electrical and Electronics Engineers (IEEE)
 Indian Society for Technical Education (ISTE)	
 ISTE Students' Chapter
 Institution of Engineers (India) Electrical Students' Chapter
 Institution of Electronics and Telecommunication Engineers (IETE)
 Indian Society for Training & Development (ISTD)
 Institution of Engineers (India) Mechanical Students' Chapter
 National Service Scheme (NSS)
 Renewable Energy Club (REC)
 Society of Automotive Engineers (SAE)
 Entrepreneurship Development Cell (EDC)
 Literary and Debating Society (LDS)

References

External links
 

Engineering colleges in Tamil Nadu
Colleges affiliated to Anna University
Thoothukudi district
1995 establishments in Tamil Nadu
Educational institutions established in 1995